Steven Jeffrey Gaynor is an American businessman and political candidate in Arizona. He ran for Secretary of State of Arizona in 2018, and won the Arizona Republican Party nomination, but narrowly lost the general election to Democrat Katie Hobbs. Gaynor declared his candidacy for the 2022 Arizona gubernatorial election as a Republican. In June 2021, he withdrew before the primary.

Early life and education 
Gaynor is originally from New York. He graduated with an MBA from Harvard Business school. Gaynor is Jewish.

Business career 
Gaynor moved to Arizona in 1981 and purchased a small printing company which he grew to employ 350 people by 2007. In 2014 his printing company paid $134,000 to settle claims of underpaid workers.

Political career
In 2018 he ran as the Arizona Republican Party for Secretary of State of Arizona, defeating Michelle Reagan for the nomination. He lost the general election narrowly to the Democratic candidate Katie Hobbs. The race was so close that numerous media outlets, including the Associated Press, reported Gaynor as the winner. Gaynor ultimately conceded to Hobbs 11 days after the election.

In 2019 Gaynor founded of Fair Maps Arizona, a 501(c)(4) organization that has supported Republican political efforts in Arizona.

On June 25, 2021, Gaynor declared his candidacy for the 2022 Arizona gubernatorial election as a Republican.

Political positions
Gaynor has been described as a social and fiscal conservative. He is reportedly pro-life, and is a lifetime member of the National Rifle Association.

Electoral history

Personal life 
Gaynor is married to his wife Dorothy, who he met while studying at Harvard. Together they have three children.

References 

American businesspeople
American political candidates
Harvard Business School alumni
Jewish American people in Arizona politics
Living people
1955 births